Ectopiocerus anthracinus is a monotypic species of plant bugs in the family Miridae.

References

Further reading

 
 
 

Articles created by Qbugbot
Mirini